Events in the year 1897 in India.

Incumbents
 Empress of India – Queen Victoria
 Viceroy of India – Victor Bruce, 9th Earl of Elgin

Events
 National income - 5,561 million
 The Indian famine of 1896–97 comes to a close
 Scindia School is established in Gwalior
 Frontier War of 1897–98
 Battle of Saragarhi
 12 June – The 8.0  Assam earthquake shook northeastern India with a maximum Mercalli intensity of X (Extreme), killing 1,542.
 Construction of Indian education service

Law
Epidemic Diseases Act
General Clauses Act
Indian Fisheries Act

Births
 23 January – Subhas Chandra Bose, one of the leaders of the Indian independence movement (dies 1945).
 8 February – Zakir Hussain, politician and third president of India (dies 1969).
 19 April – Peter de Noronha, businessman and civil servant (dies 1970).
 26 April – Nitin Bose, Indian film director, cinematographer and screenwriter (dies 1986)
 3 May – V. K. Krishna Menon, nationalist and politician (dies 1974).
 2 November – Sohrab Modi, Indian Parsi stage and film actor, director and producer (dies 1984)
 Sahana Devi Indian singer and niece of Chittaranjan Das is born (dies 1990)

Deaths
 Abdul Ghani Saheb Saudagar, trader and business person dies (born 1843)

References

 
India
Years of the 19th century in India